Mikhaylovskaya is a rural locality (a village) in Tarnogskoye Rural Settlement, Tarnogsky District, Vologda Oblast, Russia. The population was 26 as of 2002.

Geography 
Mikhaylovskaya is located 17 km northeast of Tarnogsky Gorodok (the district's administrative centre) by road. Manyukovskaya is the nearest rural locality.

References 

Rural localities in Tarnogsky District